The Radicalism of the American Revolution is a nonfiction book by historian Gordon S. Wood, published by Vintage Books as a paperback in 1993. The first printing of the hardcover edition notes a publication date of December 1991. In the book, Wood explores the radical character of the American Revolution. The book was awarded the 1993 Pulitzer Prize for History.

Gordon S. Wood attempted to reconcile his previous arguments in The Creation of the American Republic, 1776-1787, with myriad analytical categories, especially emotions, in this book. Wood's contentions remained the same from his revised dissertation sans the extensive foray into 1776-87 state constitutionalism. Wood divided the narrative into three parts: monarchy, republicanism, and democracy.

Background
Gordon S. Wood ended The Creation of the American Republic, 1776-1787, a 1969 book based on a dissertation supervised by Bernard Bailyn, with the "End of Classical Politics." Wood argued that, in the wake of the last federalist rebuttal during the ratification debates, "the stability of government...now depended upon the prevention of the various social interests from incorporating themselves too firmly in the government. Institutional or governmental politics was thus abstracted in a curious way from its former associations with the society...This revolution marked an end of the classical conception of politics." The first section of the book explored how and why "the colonists" appropriated "Whig" absolute "ideals" of "liberty," which ultimately came to represent the unity of "personal liberty" with "public liberty" as well as representation by a "natural aristocracy." By the last chapter of the book, Wood declared that "public or political liberty, the right of the people to share in the government—lost its significance for a system in which the people participated throughout. The liberty that was now emphasized was personal or private...[they began to] regard public and private liberty as antagonistic rather than complementary...Such a total grounding of government in self-interest and consent had made old-fashioned popular revolutions obsolete."

In 1992, as Gordon S. Wood's The Radicalism of the American Revolution first circulated among scholars, historian Daniel T. Rodgers attempted to define the parameters of the debates launched by The Ideological Origins of the American Revolution and Creation of the American Republic. Rodgers posited periodization as the source of much controversy between what he deemed adherents of "Harvard republicanism" and proponents of "St. Louis republicanism." In the context of The Creation of the American Republic, "when Wood turned to the early national period he found a society dancing feverishly to the tune of 'modern American liberalism.' The mark of St. Louis republicanism, by contrast, was a reluctance to date the 'end of classical politics' as early as Wood had put it." As a result of these fractious disputes, "RepublicanismH collapsed all at once in a clatter of constitutional argument. RepublicanismS staggered on to a slower death." His review essay did not include the extended periodization in Radicalism. 

Wood clarified the vaunted and maligned "End of Classical Politics" in a new preface to his 1969 study. First, he reminded readers, "it is important to remember that the boxlike categories of 'republicanism' and 'liberalism' are essentially the inventions of us historians." In Wood's estimation, the bifurcation of "Harvard republicanism" and "St. Louis republicanism" had been premised on "the mistaken notion that one set of ideas simply replaced another en bloc." He sought to mitigate scholarly conflicts by curbing meanings ascribed to this phrase: "after the debates and discoveries of 1787-88 most Americans (John Adams was a conspicuous exception) more or less ceased talking about politics in the way theorists since Aristotle had—as a maneuvering and mixing of three social entities or forms of government [monarchy, lords, commons]—and began talking about politics in recognizably modern ways—as a competition among interests or parties in the society for control of a quasi-autonomous state...Cultural changes of that magnitude do not take place in such a neat and sudden manner. Republicanism was indeed gradually transformed into something we call liberalism, but in subtle and complicated ways that kept many republican sentiments alive."

Synopsis

Gordon S. Wood argued in Radicalism that in the "classical republican tradition our modern distinction between positive and negative liberties was not yet clearly perceived, and the two forms of liberty were still often seen as one." Wood premised this concluding argument with the notion that "public or political liberty---or what we now call positive liberty---meant participation in government. And this political liberty in turn provided the means by which the personal liberty and private rights of the individual---what we today call negative liberty---were protected."

Wood's "classical republican tradition" rooted "virtue" in "liberty and independence." If such "disinterestedness" in government "was based on liberty and independence, then it followed that only autonomous individuals free from any ties of interest and paid by no master were qualified to be citizens. Jefferson and many other republican idealists hoped that all ordinary yeoman farmers who owned their own land...would be independent and free enough of pecuniary temptations and marketplace interests to be virtuous." Still, for many "republican idealists" in "monarchical society," a "disinterested leadership could only be located among the landed gentry whose income [derived] from the rents of tenants." Yet, most "merchants active in their businesses" sought to attain "wealth and leisure sufficient to avoid any day-to-day involvement in their businesses."  The "jealousy and suspicion" of these "republican idealists" were "necessary evils to offset" monarchical "power." In addition, their "world" still seemed "small and intimate enough to hold particular men morally responsible for all that occurred within it. Which is why the colonists especially were quick to explain a concatenation of events as caused by conspiracy."

The Revolution also sparked unresolved "ideological" debates over the socioeconomic consequences of the "commercial nature of real estate." Wood explained that "virtue became identified with decency" and was "soft and feminized." Ideas of "classical virtue had flowed from the citizen's participation in politics...But modern virtue flowed from the citizen's participation in society, not in government, which the liberal-minded increasingly saw as the principal source of the evils of the world." During the American Revolution, "some now argued that even commerce, that traditional enemy of classical virtue, was in fact a source of modern virtue." Wood even described this "domestication of virtue" as "progressive"  and emphasized that it "helped reconcile classical republicanism ["liberty"] with modernity and commerce."

Gordon S. Wood cast early Federalism as a response to Anti-Federalist questions regarding the very notion of an expansive "[the] United States" and the solecism imperium-in-imperio, sovereignty-within-sovereignty. James Madison and his Federalists offered a last rebuttal: the locus of "power," sovereignty, would be vested in "the people," not in organs of government. In his earlier dissertation, Wood described the Federalist rebuttal as "disingenuous." He also previously described this "mutuality of interests" as generating a crucible for "the alliance of power and liberty." 

In an "American science of politics," electoral campaigns sought to cultivate reflective constituent "interests" for refractive disinterested officeholding that, in turn, partially attempted to "umpire" and encompass these "interests." For Federalists, the latter included, and also checked, the former. Government harnessed "interests," which transformed "positive liberty" into, for instance, the United States public interest, sustained by "patrician" disinterestedness.  Wood held that the idea of government officials as "umpires" for "republican liberty" was soon discarded. "By the late 1780s," Wood mused, "many of the younger revolutionary leaders like James Madison were willing to confront the reality of interests in America," exemplified by Madison's Federalist No. 10. The federal government became a " 'disinterested and dispassionate umpire in disputes between different passions and interests in the State.' " Even with plans to expand public education, potential officeholders, more than voters, needed to become "liberally educated and cosmopolitan enough to have the breadth of perspective to comprehend all the different interests in society." In the writings of framers and Federalists alike, there was a much higher probability that a university legal education or apprenticeship for reading law, out of all the "learned professions," would win the electoral day. Anti-Federalists pointed out that the profits derived from litigation, even if supplemented by pro bono work, turned "lawyers into tradesmen or artisans" in an interests-based political economy. Not so, rejoined Wood's Alexander Hamilton: "being a lawyer was not an occupation and different from other profit-making activities." The "learned professions" formed " 'no distinct interest in society' and thus were best suited to be elected by their constituents. They...will be most likely be an 'impartial arbiter' among the diverse interests and occupations of the society."

In Gordon S. Wood's appraisal, both Federalists and Anti-Federalists defined U.S. actual representation against British virtual representation. Both Federalists and Anti-Federalists concurred that elections, premised on courting and cultivating voter reflective "interests," propelled candidates into public office. Both Federalists and Anti-Federalists ultimately countenanced a surplus of such candidates in extended electoral spheres, which James Madison conjectured increased campaign competition and the likelihood that anxious elected delegates, despite serving in faraway eighteenth-century federal seats, would constantly clamor to demonstrate representation of the reflective "interests" of constituents. In Federalist No. 10, Madison argued that refractive representation defined republics, yet attempted to address in-person reflective potentials of pure democracy. Madison's conclusions, in Wood's interpretation, partially signified interests-based liberal representative democracy without a signifier for representative democracy.

Wood argued that Federalist promotion of disinterested patrician "umpires" refracted representation in order to check, rather than eclipse, interests-based reflective representation in an "American science of politics." James Madison reiterated, in an oft-quoted passage from Federalist No. 56, that "it is a sound and important principle that the representative ought to be acquainted with the interests and circumstances of his constituents. But this principle can extend no further than to those circumstances and interests to which the authority and care of the representative relate." The crux of the matter, according to Wood in both Radicalism and his previous "Interests and Disinterestedness in the Making of the Constitution" (1987), was the fulfillment of both "patrician" refractive disinterestedness and representative extension of categorical "authority" over myriad "interests," such as electoral district boundaries, income, vocation, commerce, urban labor, etc., that is, how representatives can reflectively relate to their constituents. Also, Madison expressed concerns about government by the "few" as well as, in contradistinction, government by the "many." In writing Federalist No. 62, for instance, Madison grew skeptical of any fiscal "regulation" because, in a counterintuitive fashion, "every new regulation concerning commerce or revenue; or in any manner affecting the value of the different species of property, presents a new harvest to those who watch the change and can trace its consequences; a harvest reared not by themselves but by the toils and cares of the great body of their fellow citizens. This is a state of things in which it may be said with some truth that laws are made for the few not for the many." Absent from Wood's narrative was James Madison's own possible 1787-88 reflective "interests" and any immediate consequences of Madison's three-fifths ratio.

At any rate, Federalists and Anti-Federalists diverged over their predictions for which candidates would, and even should, most frequently win in federal elections. They also disagreed over how these delegates enacted federalism and exactly what these delegates did in the federal Capitol. For proponents of Constitutional ratification, the crucial tenet in understanding how Federalist officeholders could persist as disinterested refractive "umpires" and reflective representatives of electoral districts, particularly within an interests-based political economy, was "a notion that has carried into our own time---that lawyers and other professionals are somehow free of the marketplace, are less selfish and interested and therefore better equipped for political leadership and disinterested decision-making than merchants and businessmen." Again, Federalists believed that "lawyers," despite having "to live off 'the hard earned profits of the law,' " were "somehow free of the marketplace" and "less selfish and interested." These "lawyers," and similar practitioners of "learned professions" with "proprietary wealth" for education, proved "natural" vessels to maintain the pre-Socratic unity of opposites in Wood's "the ideas, the rhetoric" of "republican liberty" (within a variety of visual, emotional, etc., significations), especially during the shift to liberal representative democracy, in part only introduced by James Madison due to persistent state property requirements for voting. In the "liberal" keys that sounded Gordon S. Wood's rhapsody of "republican liberty," Federalist representatives were indeed "liberally educated and cosmopolitan enough to have the breadth of perspective to comprehend all the different interests in society."

The future surprisingly lay not with the triumphant Federalists in Gordon S. Wood's story. In Anti-Federalist disquisitions, Wood explained, "society" reflected "a heterogenous mixture of 'many different classes or orders of people, Merchants, Farmers, Planters, Mechanics, and Gentry or wealthy Men'...'Lawyers and planters,' whatever their genteel pretensions, could never be 'adequate judges of tradesmen's concerns.' The occupations and interests of the society were so diverse and discrete that only individuals sharing a particular occupation or interest could speak for that occupation or interest. It was foolish to tell people that they ought to overlook their local interests when local interests were all there really were." The Anti-Federalists who "lost the battle over the Constitution" believed that "only an explicit form of representation that allowed Germans, Baptists, artisans, farmers, and so on each to send delegates of its own kind into the political arena could embody the democratic particularism of the emerging society of the early Republic. Momentous consequences eventually flowed from these Anti-Federalist arguments. In these populist Anti-Federalist calls for the most explicit form of representation possible, and not in Madison's Federalist No. 10, lay the real origins of American pluralism and American interest-group politics. The grass-roots Anti-Federalists concluded that, given the variety of competing interests and the fact that all people had interests, the only way for a person to be fairly and accurately represented in government was to have someone like himself with his same interests speak for him; no one else could be trusted to do so. Ultimately, the logic of this conception of actual representation determined that no one could be represented in government unless he had the right to vote. The interests of a person were so particular, so personal, that only by exercising the ballot could he protect and promote his interests. Election in America became the sole criterion for representation. Insofar as American politics became localist and dominated by interest groups and calls for extended suffrage, the Anti-Federalists prepared the way."

Gordon S. Wood concluded Radicalism with the rise of a fledgling Jacksonian democracy, contending that voters appropriated the "Federalist Persuasion" of an "interests"-based popular sovereignty ("Chapter 14: Interests") and "celebration of commerce" ("Chapter 18: The Celebration of Commerce"), much to the chagrin of many, but by no means all, of the former persuaders in their twilight years. The late eighteenth-century idea of the "equality" of sensations and benevolent "feeling," bestowed on a "moral" humanity by the deistic "Creator," gave rise to the idea of "equality" ("Chapter 13: Equality") of opportunity in political economy. These notions of "equality" potentially included diverse segments of "society," but interpretations by the historical actors featured in the book neither necessarily expanded bodies politic, nor civil government, much past self-described "white males." In an oft-quoted passage, Wood observed that "government officials were no longer to play the role of umpire; they were no longer to stand above the competing interests of the marketplace and make disinterested, impartial judgements about what was good for the whole society. Elected officials were to bring the partial, local interests of the society, and sometimes even their own interests, right into the workings of government. Partisanship and parties became legitimate activities in politics. And all adult white males, regardless of their property holdings of their independence, were to have the right to vote. By 1825 every state but Rhode Island, Virginia, and Louisiana had achieved universal white manhood suffrage." This appropriation nevertheless proved a cornerstone for Wood's ultimate argument that "the Revolution was the most radical and most far-reaching event in American history."

Reception

References 

1993 non-fiction books
20th-century history books
History books about the American Revolution
Pulitzer Prize for History-winning works
Vintage Books books